Nathan Rapoport (1911–1987) was a Warsaw-born Jewish sculptor and painter, later a resident of Israel and then the United States.

Biography
Natan Yaakov Rapoport was  born in Warsaw, Poland. In 1936, he won a scholarship to study in France and Italy. He fled to the Soviet Union when the Nazis invaded Poland. The Soviets initially provided him with a studio, but then forced him to work as a manual laborer. When the war ended, he returned to Poland to study at the Academy of Fine Arts in Warsaw and  immigrated to Israel. In 1959, he moved to the United States. He lived in New York City until his death in 1987.

Monumental art
His sculptures in public places, with the year they were installed in, include:
 Monument to the Ghetto Heroes (1948), bronze, Warsaw, Poland
 Memorial to the Warsaw Ghetto Uprising (1976), bronze, at Yad Vashem, Jerusalem; a slightly modified replica of the Warsaw monument
 The Warsaw Ghetto Uprising, bronze
 The Last March, bronze
 Monument to Mordechai Anielewicz (1951), at Kibbutz Yad Mordechai, Israel
 Monument to Six Million Jewish Martrys (1964), at the Horwitz-Wasserman Holocaust Memorial Plaza on Benjamin Franklin Parkway, Philadelphia, PA. 
 Scroll of Fire (1971) in the Forest of the Martyrs near Jerusalem
 Liberation (Holocaust memorial) (1985), bronze, Liberty State Park, Jersey City, New Jersey
 Korczak's Last Walk at the Park Avenue Synagogue, New York, NY.
 Ghetto Square Monument at Yad Vashem, Jerusalem, Israel. https://www.yadvashem.org/articles/general/warsaw-memorial-personal-interpretation.html

Gallery

References

Further reading
 Coen, Paolo,  «L’artista reagisce in modo artistico. Questa è la sua arma». Riflessioni di valore introduttivo sul rapporto arte-Shoah, da Alexander Bogen e Nathan Rapoport a Richard Serra, in Vedere l'Altro, vedere la Shoah, with an appendix by Angelika Schallenberg, Soveria Mannelli, Rubbettino, 2012, pp. 6-68
 Gilbert, Martin. (1987), The Holocaust, New York, Random House, 1987, 317-324.
 Sohar, Zvi, Fighters Memorial, Monuments to the Fighters in the Warsaw Ghetto Uprising, Sifriat Poalim, Workers' Book Guild, 1964.
 Yaffe, Richard, Nathan Rapoport Sculptures and Monuments, New York, Shengold Publishers, 1980.

External links 

 
 Rapaport's works in Central Jewish Library

 POLIN Museum of the History of Polish Jews

Jewish sculptors
Polish sculptors
Polish male sculptors
Polish emigrants to Israel
Israeli emigrants to the United States
1911 births
1987 deaths
Academy of Fine Arts in Warsaw alumni
20th-century sculptors
Burials at Segula Cemetery